Cold as the Clay is the second solo album by Bad Religion's vocalist Greg Graffin. It was released on July 10, 2006 in Europe, and the following day in the United States. It follows on from Graffin's 1997 release of American Lesion.

Graffin has described the album as "honor[ing] the legacy of American music. [...] Traditional songs that helped form the 18th and 19th century American cultural landscape. The modern songs are inspired by my love of country rock in vein of Gram Parsons, The Band, Neil Young". It was produced by fellow Bad Religion member, Brett Gurewitz ("Mr. Brett"), and features appearances by Jolie Holland, and members of The Weakerthans, in contrast to American Lesion, where Graffin recorded the entire album by himself. A special Vinyl edition was released to celebrate Record Store Day 2017.

Track listing 
The Epitaph records website gives the track listing as:

 "Don't Be Afraid to Run" – 4:12
 "Omie Wise" – 3:53
 "Cold as the Clay" – 3:19
 "Little Sadie" – 2:35
 "Highway" – 2:34
 "Rebel's Goodbye" – 3:52
 "Talk about Suffering" (with Jolie Holland) – 3:36
 "Willie Moore" – 3:56
 "California Cotton Fields" (with Jolie Holland) – 2:32
 "The Watchmaker's Dial" – 2:30
 "One More Hill" – 3:02
Tracks #1, 3, 5, 6, 10 written by Greg Graffin, tracks #2, 4, 7, 8, 11 are traditional songs with many versions and unknown writers, track #9 by Dallas Frazier & Earl Montgomery.

Another track, Footprints in the Snow, was originally announced as the 12th track of the album, but was removed during production.

Personnel 
 Greg Graffin – vocals, acoustic guitar, harmonica, piano
 Jolie Holland – backing vocals
 Brett Gurewitz – backing vocals
 Stephen Carroll – guitar/slide guitar
 Joe Wack – guitar
 Chris Berry – guitar, banjo
 David Bragger – fiddle, banjo, mandolin
 Greg Smith (Canadian musician) – bass
 Jason Tait – drums

References 

Greg Graffin albums
2006 albums
Folk albums by American artists
Anti- (record label) albums
Alternative country albums by American artists
Old-time music